Tea a genus of spider-hunting wasps belonging to the family Pompilidae. Tea may be a subgenus of Eoferreola Arnold 1935

Species
 Tea mixta (Tournier, 1895) (Italy)
 Tea rhombica (Christ, 1791) (Austria, France, Italy, Turkey)
 Tea thoracica (Rossi, 1794) (Spain, Italy)

References

Hymenoptera genera
Pompilidae